This list of radio stations in the Republic of Ireland lists all licensed radio stations broadcast in the Republic of Ireland, sorted first by legal status, then by area.

The abbreviations LW, MW, FM, DAB and DTT indicate the broadcasting bands used by each station.

Public radio stations

National analogue and digital radio 

 RTÉ Radio 1 (87.8–90.2 FM, 252 LW, DTT)
 RTÉ 2FM (90.4–92.2 and 97.0 FM, DTT)
 RTÉ Raidió na Gaeltachta (92.6–94.4 and 102.7 FM, DTT)
 RTÉ lyric fm (95.2, 96.7 and 97.8–99.6 FM, DTT)

National digital radio 

 RTÉ Radio 1 Extra (DTT)
 RTÉ Pulse (DTT)
 RTÉ 2XM (DTT)
 RTÉjr Radio (DTT)
 RTÉ Chill (DTT)
 RTÉ Gold (DTT)

Private radio stations

Independent national radio 

 Newstalk (103.3, 105.8–107.9 FM)
 Today FM (97.3, 100.0–101.8, 105.5 FM)

Independent regional radio 

 Beat 102 103 (102.0–103.1 FM) – Counties Carlow, Kilkenny, Waterford, Wexford and south Tipperary
 iRadio (96.9, 102.1–106.7 FM) – Counties Cavan, Donegal, Galway, Kildare, Leitrim, Longford, Louth, Mayo, Meath, Monaghan, Offaly, Roscommon, Sligo, Westmeath and north-east County Laois
 SPIN South West (94.7, 102.3–103.9 FM) – Counties Clare, Limerick, Kerry, north Tipperary and south-west County Laois

Independent multi-city radio 

 Ireland's Classic Hits Radio (94.6–95.4, 97.2–97.4 and 104.2–104.9 FM) – Counties Clare, Cork, Dublin, Galway, Kildare, Limerick, Meath and Wicklow
 Spirit Radio (87.7, 89.8-94.5 FM and 549 MW) – Dublin, Cork, Limerick, Galway and Waterford cities and Athlone, Bray, Carlow, Clonmel, Drogheda, Dundalk, Ennis, Greystones, Kilkenny, Killarney, Letterkenny, Naas, Navan, Sligo, Tralee and Wexford on FM; nationwide on MW

Independent local radio

Dublin 

 98FM (97.4 and 98.1 FM)
 FM104 (103.1 and 104.4 FM)
 Q102 (101.5 and 102.2 FM)
 Radio Nova (95.7 and 100.1–100.5 FM)
 SPIN 1038 (103.5 and 103.8 FM)
 Sunshine 106.8 (106.6 and 106.8 FM)

Cork 

 C103 (102.6–103.9 FM)
 Cork's 96FM (95.6–96.8 FM)
 Red FM (104.2–106.1 FM)

Connacht 

 Galway Bay FM (95.8–97.4 FM) – west County Galway
 MidWest Radio (95.4–97.2 FM) – County Mayo
 Ocean FM (94.7, 102.5, 103.0 and 105.0 FM) – County Sligo, north County Leitrim and south County Donegal
 Shannonside FM (95.7, 97.2 and 104.1 FM) – County Roscommon, south County Leitrim, east County Galway and north-west County Longford

Leinster (excluding Dublin) 

 East Coast FM (94.9, 96.2, 99.9, 102.9 and 104.4 FM) – County Wicklow
 KCLR 96FM (94.6 and 96.0–96.9 FM) – Counties Carlow and Kilkenny
 Kfm (97.3 and 97.6 FM) – County Kildare
 LMFM (95.5–96.5 FM) – Counties Louth and Meath
 Midlands 103 (95.4–96.5 and 102.6–103.5 FM) – Counties Laois, Offaly, Westmeath and south-east County Longford
 South East Radio (95.6–96.4 FM) – County Wexford

Munster (excluding Cork) 

 Clare FM (95.2–96.6 FM) – County Clare
 Live 95 (95.0 and 95.3 FM) – County Limerick
 Radio Kerry (96.2–97.6 FM) – County Kerry
 Tipp FM (95.3, 97.1 and 103.3–103.9 FM) – County Tipperary
 WLR FM (94.8–95.5 and 97.5 FM) – County Waterford

Ulster 

 Highland Radio (94.7–95.2 and 102.1–104.7 FM) – north County Donegal
 Northern Sound (94.8, 96.3 and 97.5 FM) – Counties Cavan and Monaghan

Community radio 

 Athlone Community Radio (88.4 FM) – Athlone, County Westmeath
 Claremorris Community Radio (94.6 FM) – Claremorris, County Mayo
 Community Radio Castlebar (102.9 FM) – Castlebar, County Mayo
 Community Radio Kilkenny City (88.7 FM) – Kilkenny city
 Community Radio Youghal (104.0 FM) – Youghal and east County Cork
 Connemara Community Radio (87.8–88.4, 102.2 and 106.1 FM) – west County Galway
 Dublin South FM (93.9 FM) – south County Dublin
 Dundalk FM (97.7 FM) – Dundalk, County Louth
 Liffey Sound FM (96.4 FM) – Lucan, County Dublin
 Near FM (90.3 FM) – north-east Dublin city
 Phoenix FM (92.5 FM) – Dublin 15
 Raidió Corca Baiscinn (92.5, 94.8 and 106.4 FM) – south-west County Clare
 Raidió na Life (106.4 FM) – Dublin city and County Dublin
 Ros FM (94.6 FM) – County Roscommon
 Tipperary Mid-West Radio (104.8 and 106.7 FM) – Tipperary town, Cashel and south County Tipperary
 West Limerick 102 (101.4, 101.6 and 102.2 FM) – west County Limerick

Community interest radio 

 Flirt FM (101.3 FM) – National University of Ireland, Galway
 Juice FM (88.7 FM) – Coláiste Stiofáin Naofa, Cork  (30 days on FM temporary licence per college year)
 UCC 98.3FM (98.3 FM) – University College Cork
 Wired FM (99.9 FM) – Limerick city

Institutional radio 

 CUH FM (102.0 FM) – Cork University Hospital
 Dreamtime Radio (90.9 FM) – SOS Kilkenny
 Limerick Regional Hospital Radio (94.2 FM) – University Hospital Limerick 
 South Tipperary General Hospital Radio (93.7 FM) – South Tipperary General Hospital, Clonmel
 St. Ita's Hospital Radio (89.5 FM) – St Ita's Hospital, Portrane

Special interest radio 

 Dublin City FM (103.2 FM) – Dublin city

Religious radio 

 Life FM (93.1 FM) – Christian radio, Cork city
Radio Maria Ireland (DTT) – Catholic radio 
UCB Ireland (DTT)  - United Christian Broadcasters.

Digital radio 

 Dublin Digital Radio –  Experimental and community radio, Dublin City/ online

See also

Radio in the Republic of Ireland
List of Irish newspapers
Television in Ireland

References

External links
 Radiowaves.FM, a long-running Irish radio tribute and resource website
 A comprehensive list of Irish radio stations, provided by LiveRadio.ie

 
Radio stations in the Republic of Ireland